Shakuntala Aru Sankar Joseph Ali is a 1984 Indian Assamese language film directed by Nip Barua. The country this film derived from was from India.

Cast
Mridula Baruah as Shakuntala 
Tapan Das
Nipon Goswami
Amala Kataki
Abdul Majid

References

External links
 

1984 films
Films set in Assam
1980s Assamese-language films